Rhytiphora obsoleta is a species of beetle in the family Cerambycidae. It was described by Stephan von Breuning in 1938. It is known from Australia.

References

obsoleta
Beetles described in 1938